Luis Abraham Coreas Privado (10 August 1950 - 13 March 1978) was a Salvadoran footballer.

Club career
Nicknamed el Muñeco, Luis Abraham played for the  Juan Francisco Barraza-managed Águila, in which the big highlight came when on 20 November 1972, he scored the lone goal against Municipal Limeño to give Aguila their sixth national title.
In 1974, Luis Abraham joined Luis Ángel Firpo and went on to play club football in Guatemala.

Personal life
He is the brother of former footballers Víctor Coreas Privado, Salvador Coreas Privado, Marcos Coreas and Carlos Coreas.

He is also the father of former footballers Luis Abraham Coreas López (who played for  Firpo, Santa Clara, Dragón, Liberal de Quelepa and Real Esteli( Nicaragua).

Death

References

1950 births
1978 deaths
People from San Miguel Department (El Salvador)
Association football forwards
Salvadoran footballers
El Salvador international footballers
C.D. Águila footballers
C.D. Luis Ángel Firpo footballers